In enzymology, a homocysteine S-methyltransferase is an enzyme that catalyzes the chemical reaction

S-methylmethionine + L-homocysteine  2 L-methionine

Thus, the two substrates of this enzyme are S-methylmethionine and L-homocysteine, and it produces 2 molecules of L-methionine.

This enzyme belongs to the family of transferases, specifically those transferring one-carbon group methyltransferases.  The systematic name of this enzyme class is S-adenosyl-L-methionine:L-homocysteine S-methyltransferase. This enzyme participates in methionine metabolism.

Alternative names
Other names of this enzyme in common use include S-adenosylmethionine homocysteine transmethylase, S-methylmethionine homocysteine transmethylase, adenosylmethionine transmethylase, methylmethionine:homocysteine methyltransferase, adenosylmethionine:homocysteine methyltransferase, homocysteine methylase, homocysteine methyltransferase, homocysteine transmethylase, L-homocysteine S-methyltransferase, S-adenosyl-L-methionine:L-homocysteine methyltransferase, S-adenosylmethionine-homocysteine transmethylase, and S-adenosylmethionine:homocysteine methyltransferase.

References

 
 
 

EC 2.1.1
Enzymes of unknown structure